Beat Noir is fourth studio album by Spahn Ranch, released on October 19, 1998 by Out of Line and Sub/Mission Records. It was reissued on November 24 of that year by Cleopatra Records. The final track "An Exit" was licensed to Cleopatra Records to be released on the various artists compilation The Black Bible in 1998.

Reception

AllMusic gave Beat Noir gave two and a half out of five possible stars. Music critic Dave Thompson said "from the infectious opening riff of "Fire Lives in the Hearts of All Men," to the near reverent melodies entwined within the synth structure of "Ride like Lightning Crash like Thunder," a tight, edgy, yet absolutely hummable album that is solid throughout." Ink 19 was negatively critical of the album's misdirected experimentation and claimed that Athan Maroulis' vocal choices were unsuited for the album's genre.

Track listing

Accolades

Personnel
Adapted from the Beat Noir liner notes.

Spahn Ranch
 Matt Green – programming, keyboards, production, mixing
 Harry Lewis – percussion
 Athan Maroulis – lead vocals

Additional performers
 David J – bass guitar (6, 10)
 Eric Powell – programming (1)

Production and design
 Mick Cripps – design
 Eric Fahlborg – mastering
 Steve Tushar – engineering, mixing

Release history

References

External links 
 Beat Noir at iTunes
 

1998 albums
Spahn Ranch (band) albums
Cleopatra Records albums
Out of Line Music albums